The Lopburi Solar Farm is a 55-megawatt (MW) photovoltaic power station in Lopburi Province, Thailand. The plant was constructed over a period of 18 months beginning in 2010 with a loan of US$70 million (two billion baht) from the Asian Development Bank, and was expected to generate 105 GWh/year. An additional 11 MW were added to the initial capacity of 73.16 MW in May 2013. Thailand used 145,300.19 GWh in 2009. The original cost estimate was US$271 million.

A 2014 review of the activity reported that the project had concluded two years of successful activity. The review classified the project as "highly successful".

See also 

 List of photovoltaic power stations
 Photovoltaic power stations
 Solar power in Thailand

References 

Photovoltaic power stations in Thailand